Lewis Raymond Marquardt (November 7, 1936 – May 31, 2020) was an American politician and educator.

Early life and education 
Marquardt was born in Jamestown, North Dakota and raised in Linton, North Dakota. He earned a Bachelor of Arts from Minot State University and PhD in humanities Arizona State University. To finance his college tuition, Marquardt founded and performed in The Collegiates, a dance band that toured around North Dakota and Montana.

Career 
Marquardt served in the United States Army from 1958 to 1961, working as a Russian linguist stationed in Kassel, Germany. Marquardt lived with his wife and family in Webster, South Dakota and taught at the Webster High School. He served in the South Dakota House of Representatives from 1968 to 1970 as a Democrat. He then taught at the Arizona State University and the Texas State University San Marcos.

Death 
Marquardt died on May 31, 2020 in Austin, Texas.

Notes

1936 births
2020 deaths
People from Jamestown, North Dakota
People from Webster, South Dakota
Military personnel from North Dakota
Minot State University alumni
Arizona State University alumni
Arizona State University faculty
Texas State University faculty
Democratic Party members of the South Dakota House of Representatives